Molineux may refer to:

William Molineux, American, participant in the Boston Tea Party
Molineux Stadium, home of Wolverhampton Wanderers F.C. in Wolverhampton, England
Sophie Molineux (born 1998), Australian cricketer
Molineux, New York State evidence standard, established in People v. Molineux (1901)

See also
Molyneux (disambiguation)
Moulineaux, a commune in the Seine-Maritime department in the Normandy region in northern France
"My Kinsman, Major Molineux", short story by American author Nathaniel Hawthorne